S7 is a line on the Berlin S-Bahn. It operates from Ahrensfelde to Potsdam over:
the Wriezen Railway, completed on 1 May 1898 and electrified to Marzahn in 1976, to Mehrower Allee in 1980 and to Ahrensfelde in 1982,
a section of the Outer ring, completed in the early 1940s as part of the Outer freight ring and electrified in 1976,
a section of the Prussian Eastern line, opened on 1 October 1866 and electrified on 6 November 1928,
the Stadtbahn, opened on 7 February 1882 and electrified on 11 June 1928,
a section of the Berlin-Blankenheim line, opened west of Grunewald in 1879 and further east in 1882 and electrified in 1928 and
a section of the Berlin-Potsdam-Magdeburg line, opened in 1838 and electrified in 1928.

Gallery

References

Berlin S-Bahn lines
Transport in Potsdam